David Gullan McGrath (11 March 1899 – 5 March 1985) was an Australian rules footballer who played with Fitzroy in the Victorian Football League (VFL).

Dave McGrath was educated at the Ballarat Junior Technical School and the Ballarat School of Mines. He was a member of the successful Ballarat School of Mines Athletics Team when they won the inaugural Herald Shield for Athletics competition between Victorian Technical Schools.

Notes

External links 

1899 births
1985 deaths
Australian rules footballers from Victoria (Australia)
Fitzroy Football Club players